State elections were held in South Australia on 5 April 1924. All 46 seats in the South Australian House of Assembly were up for election. The incumbent Liberal Federation government led by Premier of South Australia Henry Barwell was defeated by the opposition Australian Labor Party led by Leader of the Opposition John Gunn. Each district elected multiple members, with voters casting multiple votes.

The Farmers and Settlers Association became known as the Country Party from this election.

Results

|}

See also
Results of the South Australian state election, 1924 (House of Assembly)
Candidates of the South Australian state election, 1924
Members of the South Australian House of Assembly, 1924–1927
Members of the South Australian Legislative Council, 1924–1927

References

History of South Australian elections 1857-2006, volume 1: ECSA
State and federal election results in Australia since 1890

Elections in South Australia
1924 elections in Australia
1920s in South Australia
April 1924 events